Romanian Superliga may refer to:
 Romanian Superliga (water polo)
 Romanian Superliga (women's football)